The Kookaburra Beast is a line of cricket bats manufactured by the Australian company Kookaburra Sport. This bat is popular with many international players, however after a decision in February 2006, the graphite backed model has been banned by the Marylebone Cricket Club in international test matches due to a speculation that the bat's graphite backing unlawfully strengthens the bat. In January 2021,'The Beast' made a stunning come-back to the cricketing world and it became quickly endorsed by some of world cricket's mega-stars including Glenn Maxwell, Martin Guptill and Shikhar Dhawan in both BBL, IPL and One Day Internationals.

Characteristics
'The Beast' as it is commonly known, is one of Kookaburra's premier bats. It is made of the highest grade of English willow wood which is naturally air dried after harvesting. The handle is made of Sarawak cane and is covered in an octopus grip. The senior model weighs between 2 lbs 7oz and 2 lbs 11oz and comes in only 'short handle' and 'long blade' sizes. Junior models exist in an array of qualities from high-grade English willow to comparatively low-grade Kashmir willow.

Professional players that use this bat
Australian Domestic players that use this bat include:
Glenn Maxwell
Brad Hodge
Brad Haddin
Simon Katich
Mitchell Johnson
Matthew Wade
Chris Hartley
Tim Paine
Graham Manou
Brett Lee
Kumar Sangakkara

Models
There are several models that fall in the Beast line. They include:

Senior models
The Beast
Wild Beast
Angry beast
Fiery beast
Binga Beast
Pure Beast

Junior models
Wild beast
Little beast

References

 Crickinfo.com 
 Kookaburra Sport Website
 Rebel Sport

Cricket equipment